GT3 may refer to:

Automotive
 Porsche 911 GT3, a high performance version of the Porsche 911
 IMSA GT3 Cup Challenge, a one-make racing series featuring the Porsche 911 GT3
 IMSA GT3 Cup Challenge Canada, the Canadian subsidiary series
 Group GT3, a class of auto racing
 FIA GT3 European Championship, a defunct series based on Group GT3

Other uses
 Gran Turismo 3: A-Spec, a 2001 car racing game developed for the PlayStation 2
 British Rail GT3, a prototype gas turbine locomotive